Joseph Veverka (born 1941) is the James A. Weeks Professor of Physical Sciences, professor of Astronomy at Cornell University in Ithaca, New York. His research area is in planetary sciences, with a focus on physical studies of satellite surfaces and planetary rings. Veverka was the principal investigator on the NASA Discovery Program mission CONTOUR, a co-investigator of the Deep Impact space mission to Comet Tempel 1, and is the principal investigator on the NASA Discovery Mission of Opportunity, Stardust-NeXT. He is the recipient of the 2001 National Air and Space Museum Trophy and has the asteroid 2710 Veverka named after him.

Education
Veverka was born in Pelhřimov, Czechoslovakia in what is now the Czech Republic. In 1948 his family fled the communist regime going first to France and then to Canada in 1951. He grew up in Cochrane, Ontario.

Veverka received his B.S. in Physics from Queen's University in Kingston, Ontario.  He received his Ph.D. in 1970 from Harvard University, where he was a student of Fred Whipple.

Career

Mariner 9
He was a postdoctoral associate and research scientist at the Jet Propulsion Laboratory working on the Mariner 9 project.

CONTOUR
Principal Investigator on NASA's Comet Nucleus Tour (CONTOUR) mission.

Deep Impact
Co-Investigator of the NASA Deep Impact mission to comet Tempel 1 in 2005.

Stardust-NExT
Principal Investigator on the NASA Stardust-NExT mission to comet Tempel 1 in February 2011.

University positions
Veverka has been a faculty member at Cornell University since 1970. He was chair of the Department of Astronomy at the University from 1999 - 2007.

NASA advisor
Veverka continues to serve on numerous NASA committees.

National Academy of Sciences
He has served several times on the National Academy of Sciences Committee for Planetary Exploration (COMPLEX), serving as chair from 2007 - 2010. He is a member of the Space Studies Board and current Chair of the Primitive Bodies Panel of the Decadal Studies for Planetary Exploration.

Awards and honors
Veverka has been awarded the 2011 Whipple Award and the 2013 Gerard P. Kuiper Prize for his contributions to planetary science. He is the recipient of the 2001 National Air and Space Museum Trophy for leadership during the NEAR mission and in 1979 he was awarded the NASA medal for Exceptional Scientific Achievement for his investigations of Mars's moons Phobos and Deimos.

References

External links 
 Cornell Astronomy Dept.
 Cornell University Faculty Highlights
 Cornell Chronicle: Honoring Veverka, a man who chases snowballs and discovers "continents"
 Deep Impact
 

1941 births
Living people
American astronomers
Cornell University faculty
Planetary scientists
American people of Czech descent
People from Pelhřimov
Harvard University alumni
Queen's University at Kingston alumni